Duday (also Romanized as Dūdāy; also known as Dadāy) is a village in Gejlarat-e Sharqi Rural District, Aras District, Poldasht County, West Azerbaijan Province, Iran. At the 2006 census, its population was 79, in 20 families.

References 

Populated places in Poldasht County